Faquir Ali Ansari (14 June 1938  18 May 2003) was an Indian politician, trader and industrialist who served as member of parliament in 6th Lok Sabha. He represented Mirzapur parliamentary constituency in 1977. He was affiliated with Janata Party.

Biography 
He was born Abdul Quayyum Ansari on 14 June 1938 in Bhadohi city of Varanasi district. He received his education from the National Inter College, Bhadohi.

Prior to joining Janata Party, he was associated with Bharatiya Lok Dal and Bharatiya Kranti Dal. He served general secretary of Bhartiya Kranti Dal for its district committee at Varanasi unit, and vice president of Bharatiya Lok Dal District Committee. He was also a member of Bhadohi Welfare Academy.

Beferences 

1938 births
2003 deaths
India MPs 1977–1979
Politicians from Varanasi
Janata Party politicians